Marie-Louise Jensen (born 22 September 1964) is an English children's author.

Biography

Marie Louise Jensen (née Chalcraft) was born in Henley-On-Thames of an English father and Danish mother. Her early years were plagued by teachers telling her to get her head out of a book and learn useless things like maths. Marie-Louise studied Scandinavian and German with literature at the UEA and has lived in both Denmark and Germany. After teaching English  at a German University for four years, she decided to return to England to care for her children full-time. she completed an MA in writing for Young people at the Bath Spa University in 2005. She reads, reviews and writes books for young people. She lives in Bath and home educates her two sons.

Bibliography

Between Two Seas (2008)
The Lady In The Tower (2011)
Daughter of Fire and Ice (2010)
Sigrun's Secret (2011)
The Girl In The Mask (2012)
Smuggler's Kiss (2013)

Awards and nominations

2008 Between Two Seas shortlisted for the Waterstone's Children's Book Prize
2009 The Lady in the Tower shortlisted for the Waterstone's Children's Book Prize

References

External links

 Official website

1964 births
Living people
English writers
Alumni of the University of East Anglia
Alumni of the University of Bath
People from Henley-on-Thames
English women writers
English children's writers
British women children's writers